Jorma is the second solo album by Jorma Kaukonen of Hot Tuna and Jefferson Airplane. Hot Tuna had stopped touring in 1977 and Jack Casady had moved on to the band SVT.  Bill Thompson and the staff that had managed Hot Tuna and still managed Jefferson Starship in 1979 continued to manage Kaukonen. David Kahne was hired to produce and the new solo album was released on RCA.  The album consists entirely of Jorma's own vocals and his own electric and acoustic guitar work with many original songs written by Kaukonen.  The last track is a poem recited by Kaukonen with no instrumental backing.

Track listing
All tracks composed by Jorma Kaukonen; except where indicated

Side One
"Straight Ahead" (Jorma Kaukonen, Bob Steeler) – 4:15
"Roads and Roads &" – 4:14
"Valley of Tears" – 4:47
"Song for the High Mountain" – 3:05

Side Two
"Wolves and Lambs" – 3:30
"Too Long Out / Too Long In" – 5:14
"Requiem for an Angel" – 3:46
"Vampire Women" (Spark Plug Smith) – 3:27
"Da-Ga Da-Ga" (M. A. Numminen) – 1:25

Personnel
Jorma Kaukonen – guitars, vocals

Production
Jorma Kaukonen – producer
David Kahne – producer, engineer
Pat (Maurice) Ieraci – production coordinator
Wet Teeth M – cover design
Doug Carter – cover design assistance
Jacky Kaukonen – secretary
Bob Steeler – street consultant
Michael Casady – equipment
Bill Thompson – manager
Recorded and mixed at Filmways / Heider, San Francisco
Mastered by John Golden, Kendun Recorders, Burbank

Notes

Jorma Kaukonen albums
1979 albums
Albums produced by David Kahne
RCA Records albums
Albums recorded at Wally Heider Studios